Sebastian Frimmel (born 18 December 1995) is an Austrian handball player for SC Pick Szeged and the Austrian national team.

He participated at the 2018 European Men's Handball Championship.

References

External links

1995 births
Living people
Austrian male handball players
Expatriate handball players
Austrian expatriate sportspeople in Switzerland